This page lists the winners and nominees for the Soul Train Music Award for Best R&B/Soul Female Artist, which was first given in 2009. Beyoncé holds the record of most wins in this category, with four.

Winners and nominees
Winners are listed first and highlighted in bold.

2000s

2010s

2020s

See also

 List of music awards honoring women

References

Soul Train Music Awards
Music awards honoring women